Evening Light may refer to:

Operation Eagle Claw (also known as Operation Evening Light)
Sunset